is a Japanese racehorse.  The horse gained nationwide popularity in 2003, not due to her success, but rather, due to a long string of consecutive losses.

Background
Haru Urara, a bay mare, was foaled on February 27, 1996, on Nobuta Bokujo, Utafue, Mitsuishi, Hokkaido. She was sired by Nippo Teio, a top-class racehorse whose wins included the Tenno Sho and the Yasuda Kinen. Unable to find a buyer for their filly, the farm began training Haru Urara as a racehorse, under their own ownership.

Racing career
At her debut, on November 17, 1998 at the Kōchi Racetrack, Haru Urara lost, placing fifth—and last.  Over the next four-and-a-half years, she would compete once or twice every month, but was unable to obtain a single victory.

In June 2003, after garnering her 80th consecutive loss, the story was picked up by the national Japanese media, making "Haru Urara" a household name.  She quickly became very popular in Japan, and was called , for continuing to run with all her heart, despite her seemingly endless losing streak.  This surge in popularity was dubbed "The Haru Urara Boom", and news about Haru Urara even reached the international community, being reported in the United States, Canada, Germany and elsewhere.

During the boom, Haru Urara betting tickets began to be used as o-mamori, particularly for protection against traffic accidents: the word  in Japanese can mean both "to lose a bet" and "to avoid being struck", so it was said that a Haru Urara betting ticket—a guaranteed loss—could protect the owner's car from being hit. In September 2003, the Kōchi Prefecture Horse Racing Association introduced a service wherein they would stamp the word on any betting ticket related to Haru Urara. O-mamori were also created from mane and tail hairs that were said to have fallen out during brushing, but production was soon halted, due to concerns expressed by animal welfare groups.

At a race held on March 22, 2004, during the peak of her popularity, more than 13,000 spectators packed the Kochi Racetrack, 3,000 of whom had gathered outside before the gates opened, forcing the track to open 30 minutes earlier than scheduled.  Some people waited in line for up to five hours to buy tickets at the "Haru Urara Commemorative Ticket Booth", which was established especially for the event.  Fans bet a grand total of ¥121,751,200 on a Haru Urara victory, an impressive sum, particularly for a horse that had not won once in more than 100 attempts.  The race ended in disappointment, but not surprise: despite being ridden by Japan's premier jockey, Yutaka Take, Haru Urara earned her 106th consecutive loss, placing 10th among 11 horses running.

"Haru Urara" means beauty of spring in English, and it is also an idiom of the warm climate of spring in Japan, and its beautiful name is also said to be one of the reasons why Haru Urara became popular. Numerous products using Haru Urara's name or image have been produced, including stuffed toys, key rings, mobile phone straps, stickers, stamps, train tickets, rice, shochu, hats, T-shirts and bras.  A number of books and songs, as well as a film, were also written about Haru Urara during the boom period. The Japanese Prime Minister Junichiro Koizumi said "I'd like to see Haru Urara win, even just once. The horse is a good example of not giving up in the face of defeat."

Haru Urara ran her last race in August 2004 and retired with a record of 0 wins and 113 losses.

Retirement 
Originally, it was announced that Haru Urara would be returned from Tochigi where she was recuperating for a retirement race scheduled on March 2005. However, her return was soon postponed before officially being classified as retired by the NAR on October 2006, never returning to Kochi. 

Post retirement, there were plans to have her breed with Deep Impact as well as Stay Gold but never materialized. Once those plans fell through, she was transported by her owner at the time in 2013 to the Martha Farm in Onjuku, Chiba where she has lived since.

At Martha Farm, Haru Urara became a minor PR character in 2018 when she was featured in a traffic safety poster of the Kisarazu Police Station.

In popular culture 
An anthromorphized version of Haru Urara appears as a character in both the anime and game of Uma Musume Pretty Derby, and fans have since come to visit the real life Haru Urara at Martha Farm.

Pedigree

See also 
 Maiden race#Famous maiden horses
 List of historical horses
 Quixall Crossett
 Underdog
 Zippy Chippy

References 

1996 racehorse births
Racehorses bred in Japan
Racehorses trained in Japan
Thoroughbred family 12